The International Linguistics Olympiad (IOL) is one of the International Science Olympiads for secondary school students. Its abbreviation IOL is deliberately chosen not to correspond to the name of the organization in any particular language, and member organizations are free to choose for themselves how to designate the competition in their own language. This olympiad furthers the fields of mathematical, theoretical, and descriptive linguistics.

Format
The setup differs from most of the other Science Olympiads, in that the olympiad contains both individual and team contests. The individual contest consists of 5 problems, covering the main fields of theoretical, mathematical and applied linguistics – phonetics, morphology, semantics, syntax, sociolinguistics, etc. – which must be solved in six hours.

The team contest has consisted of one extremely difficult and time-consuming problem since the 2nd IOL. Teams, which generally consist of four students, are given three to four hours to solve this problem.

Like nearly all International Science Olympiads, its problems are translated and completed in several languages and as such must be written free of any native language constraints. However, unlike other olympiads, the translations are provided by the multilingual Problem Committee, a body of experts independent of the delegates' team leaders. Because competitors could gain some advantage if they are familiar with one or more of the language groups which are the subject of some of the assignments, problems are increasingly based on some of the world's lesser known languages. Fortunately, with more than 6,000 languages spoken world-wide (not including so-called dead languages) there are plenty to choose from. The committee has a policy of not using artificial or fictional languages for its problems. The presence of an independent Problem Committee and Jury means that team leaders do not have to be experts in the field (though most are): they can (and often do) work closely with their teams providing last-minute coaching throughout the week of the competition.

In any case, the most helpful ability is analytic and deductive thinking, as all solutions must include clear reasoning and justification.

History

The concept of self-sufficient linguistics problems was formulated in the 1960s, in the intellectual environment of the recently-founded Department of Theoretical and Applied Linguistics (OTiPL) of the Moscow State University. In 1963, Andrey Zaliznyak published a book with some problems on that style and, following that, the then student  proposed to the professor Vladimir Uspensky the creation of a high-school olympiad using such problems.

The Problem Committee was composed by Zhurinsky (the author of most of the problems) and Zaliznyak, plus Boris Gorodetsky (president), Alexandra Raskina and Victor Raskin. The Moscow Olympiad was held regularly until 1982 and resumed again in 1988, being still held nowadays.

In the next decades, olympiads using the format of self-sufficient linguistics problems started to appear in different regions: 
 In 1984, professor Ruslan Mitkov founded the Bulgarian Olympiad of Mathematical Linguistics, open for high-school students of the whole Bulgaria. In this olympiad, each school could participate with 4 students, thus inspiring the format of the future IOL. From 2001, the Bulgarian Olympiad also started to feature a team competition.  
 From 1988 to 2000, professor Thomas E. Payne, from the University of Oregon organized a program with linguistics problems for high-school students in the city of Eugene, Oregon, United States. The format was very similar to the Moscow Olympiad, with which he had contact in 1986, when visiting the OTiPL in Moscow. From 2001 to 2006, the competition evolved into an online format, the Linguistics Challenge, which stimulated local linguistics competitions in different U.S. cities. This movement culminated, in 2007, with the creation of the North American Computational Linguistics Open Competition.
 In 1995, a group of professors from the Saint Petersburg State University started to organize the Traditional Olympiad of Linguistics and Mathematics of Saint Petersburg, following a format very similar to that of the Moscow Olympiad. Decades later, in the 2010s, the olympiads of Moscow and Saint Petersburg merged to form a Russian National Linguistics Olympiad.
 In 2001, a group connected to the Leiden University, including Ruslan Mitkov, the founder of the Bulgarian Olympiad, and two other former participants of the Moscow Olympiad (Alexander Lubotsky participated from 1973 to 1976; Leonid Kulikov participated from 1981 to 1988), founded a Linguistics Olympiad for the Netherlands.

After the foundation of the Bulgarian olympiad, teams of winners of the Moscow Linguistic Olympiad successfully competed in Bulgaria and vice versa, demonstrating good potential for international cooperation in the field. With the multiplication of initiatives, the organizers of the different olympiads decided to organize, in 2003, the First International Olympiad in Theoretical, Mathematical and Applied Linguistics, with six participating countries: 
 Russia, with one team from the Moscow Olympiad and another from the Saint Petersburg Olympiad;
 Bulgaria, also with two teams, both from the Bulgarian Olympiad;
 Netherlands, with a team selected from its newly formed olympiad;
 Estonia, with a team from the olympiad organized in the same year by Renate Pajusalu and other professors from Tartu University;
 Latvia, with a team of students from Riga's Secondary School No 40, the former school of Alexander Berdichevsky, then a master student at the OTiPL. 
 Czech Republic, with a guest team.

Venues, year by year

IOL 2003 
The first edition of IOL then was realized from September 6 to 12, 2003, in the mountain resort Borovetz, Bulgaria, chaired by Alexander Kibrik from Moscow State University (MSU) and with the participation of six countries: Bulgaria, Czech Republic, Estonia, Latvia, Netherlands and Russia. The first International Jury was composed of Ivan Derzhanski (president) (Institute for Mathematics and Informatics of Bulgarian Academy of Sciences), Alexander Berdichevsky (MSU), Boris Iomdin (Russian Language Institute) and Elena Muravenko (Department for Russian Language, Russian State University for the Humanities). The five problems at the individual contest concerned Jacob Linzbach's "Transcendental algebra" writing system, Egyptian Arabic (Afroasiatic), Basque (Isolate), Adyghe (Northwest Caucasian), and French (Indo-European). The team contest consisted of three problems, on Tocharian (Indo-European), the use of subscripts as indices, and on performative verbs.

IOL 2004 
IOL 2 was held from August 2 to 6, 2004, in the Russian State University for the Humanities (RSUH), in Moscow, Russia. Seven countries participated, with the first participation of Poland and Serbia and Montenegro. The five problems at the individual contest were in Kayapo, Latin, English, Lakhota and Chuvash. The team problem was in Armenian.

IOL 2005 
IOL 3 was held from August 8 to 12, 2005, in Leiden, Netherlands, with the participation of 13 teams from 9 countries, Finland and Romania for their first time. The five problems at the individual contest were in Tzotzil, Lango, Mansi, Yoruba and Lithuanian.  The team problem was in Figuig.

IOL 2006 
IOL 4 was held from  August 1 to 6, 2006, at the University of Tartu, Tartu, Estonia. Chaired by Renate Pajusalu, it received also 13 teams from 9 countries, with Lithuania sending a team for the first time. The five problems at the individual contest were in Lakhota, Catalan, Khmer, Udihe and Ngoni. The team problem was in American Sign Language.

IOL 2007 
IOL 5 was held from July 31 to August 4, 2007, at the Hotel Gelios, Saint Petersburg, Russia. Chaired by Stanislav Gurevich, it received 15 teams from 9 countries; Spain, Sweden and USA came for the first time. In that year, it was decided that each country can send one or two teams, consisting of four students each, with the first team's costs fully covered by the host country. Also, the host country could send a third team. The five problems at the individual contest were in Braille, Movima (Isolate), Georgian (Kartvelian), Ndom (Trans-New Guinea), and correspondences between Turkish and Tatar (Turkic). The team problem was in Hawaiian (Polynesian) and focused on genealogical terms.

IOL 2008 
IOL 6 was held from August 4 to 9, 2008, at the Sunny Beach Resort, Sunny Beach, Bulgaria. Chaired by Iliana Raeva, it gathered 16 teams from 11 countries, including the first time for Germany, Slovenia and South Korea. The Problem Committee was chaired by Ivan Derzhanski. The five individual problems were in Micmac (Algonquian), Old Norse (North Germanic) poetry (specifically, drottkvætt), Drehu and Cemuhî correspondences (Oceanic), Copainalá Zoque (Mixe-Zoquean), and Inuktitut (Eskimo-Aleut). The team problem was about correspondences between Mandarin and Cantonese (Sinitic) using the fanqie system.

IOL 2009 
IOL 7 was held from July 26 to 31, 2009, at the University of Wrocław, Wrocław, Poland. Chaired by Michał Śliwiński, it received 23 teams from 17 countries, with Australia, United Kingdom, India and Ireland sending teams for the first time. The Problem Committee was chaired by Todor Tchervenkov (University of Lyon, France). The subject matter of the five individual problems covered: numerals in the Sulka language (Isolate), Maninka and Bamana (Mande) languages in the N'Ko and Latin scripts, traditional Burmese (Sino-Tibetan) names and their relation with dates of birth, stress position in Old Indic (Indo-Aryan) and the relation between grammar and morphology in classical Nahuatl (Uto-Aztecan). The team problem was in Vietnamese (Austroasiatic).

IOL 2010 
IOL 8 was held from July 19 to 24, 2010, at Östra Real Hostel, Stockholm, Sweden. Chaired by Hedvig Skigård, it received 26 teams from 18 countries, including first time for Norway and Singapore. The Problem Committee was chaired by Alexander Piperski.  The individual contest consisted of five problems covering: relations between various verb forms in Budukh (Northeast Caucasian), the Drehu (Oceanic) counting system, Blissymbolics, mRNA coding, and the connection between Sursilvan and Engadine dialects in Romansh (Western Romance). The team problem involved translating extracts from a monolingual Mongolian (Mongolic) dictionary.

IOL 2011 
IOL 9 was held from  July 25 to 30, 2011, at the Carnegie Mellon University, Pittsburgh, USA. Chaired by Lori Levin, it received 27 teams from 19 countries, including Brazil, Canada, United Arab Emirates and Vietnam for the first time. The Problem Committee was chaired by Adam Hesterberg. The problems of the individual contest required reasoning about Faroese (Germanic) orthography, Menominee (Algic) morphology, Vai (Mande) syntax, Nahuatl (Uto-Aztecan) semantics and the structure of the barcode language EAN-13. The team contest involved the rules and structure of Sanskrit (Indo-Aryan) poetry.

IOL 2012 
IOL 10 was held from July 29 to August 4, 2012, at the University of Ljubljana, Ljubljana, Slovenia. Chaired by Mirko Vaupotic, it received 34 teams from 26 countries, first time for China, Greece, Hungary, Israel and Japan. The Problem Committee was chaired by Ivan Derzhanski. The five problems at the individual contest were in Dyirbal (Pama-Nyungan) syntax, Umbu-Ungu (Trans-New Guinea) numbers, Basque (Isolate) pronouns, Teop (Austronesian) syntax, and Rotuman (Austronesian) semantics. The team problem involved recognizing country names in Lao language (Tai-Kadai).

IOL 2013 
IOL 11 was held from July 22 to 26, 2013, at the Manchester Grammar School, Manchester, UK. Chaired by Neil Sheldon, it received 35 teams from 26 countries, including first time teams from Isle of Man, Taiwan and Turkey. The Problem Committee was chaired by Stanislav Gurevich.  The five problems at the individual contest were about Yidiny (Pama-Nyungan) morphology, Tundra Yukaghir (Yukhagir) semantics, Pirahã (Mura) phonology, Muna (Austronesian) syntax, and telepathy based on English. The team problem involved translating Martin Seymour-Smith's list of the 100 most influential books from Georgian (Kartvelian) written in the 9th century Nuskhuri script.

IOL 2014 
IOL 12 was held from July 21 to 25, 2014, at the Beijing Language and Culture University, Beijing, China. Chaired by Jiang Yuqin, it received 39 teams from 28 countries, with Pakistan and Ukraine sending teams for the first time. The Problem Committee was chaired by Jae Kyu Lee. The five problems at the individual contest were about Benabena (Trans-New Guinea) morphology, Kiowa (Tanoan) morphophonology, Tangut (Tibeto-Burman) kinship, Engenni (Niger-Congo) syntax, and Gbaya (Niger-Congo). The team problem involved matching the articles of the Universal Declaration of Human Rights to their translations in Armenian (Indo-European).

IOL 2015 
IOL 13 was held from July 20 to 24, 2015, at the American University in Bulgaria, Blagoevgrad, Bulgaria. Chaired by Aleksandar Velinov, it received 43 teams from 29 countries, with Bangladesh, France and Kazakhstan sending teams for the first time. The Problem Committee was chaired by Bozhidar Bozhanov. The five problems at the individual contest were about Nahuatl (Uto-Aztecan) and Arammba (South-Central Papuan) numbers, morphology in the Besleney dialect of Kabardian (Abkhaz-Adyghe), Soundex, Wambaya (West Barkly) syntax and the rules of Somali (Afroasiatic) poetry. The team problem involved using extracts from a monolingual Northern Sotho (Bantu) dictionary to build a grammar and lexicon of the language.

IOL 2016 
IOL 14 was held from July 25 to 29, 2016, at the Infosys Development Center in Mysore, India. Chaired by Dr. Monojit Choudhury and Dr. Girish Nath Jha, it received 44 teams from 31 countries, with Nepal and Sri Lanka sending teams for the first time. The Problem Committee was chaired by Boris Iomdin. The five problems at the individual contest were about spatial deictics in Aralle-Tabulahan (Austronesian), Luwian hieroglyphic script (Indo-European), Kunuz Nubian (Eastern Sudanic) morphosyntax, Iatmül (Sepik) semantics and Jaqaru (Aymaran) morphology. The team problem involved matching over 100 utterances in Taa (Tuu) to their IPA transcriptions.

IOL 2017 
IOL 15 was held from July 31 to August 4, 2017, at Dublin City University in Dublin, Ireland. Chaired by Dr. Cara Greene, it received 43 teams from 27 countries, with Canada sending a Francophone team for the first time. The Problem Committee was chaired by Hugh Dobbs. The five problems at the individual content were about Berom (Plateau) numbers, Abui (Timor-Alor-Pantar) possessives and semantics, Kimbundu (Bantu) morphosyntax, Jru' (Austroasiatic) written in the Khom script and Madak (Meso-Melanesian) morphophonology. The team problem involved establishing correspondences between 87 emojis and their descriptions in Indonesian (Austronesian).

IOL 2018 
IOL 16 was held from July 26 to 30, 2018, at the Czech University of Life Sciences in Prague, Czech Republic. Chaired by Vojtěch Diatka, it received 49 teams from 29 countries, with Malaysia and Denmark competing for the first time. The Problem Committee was chaired by Maria Rubinstein. The five problems at the individual contest concerned Creek (Muskogean) stress, Hakhun (Sal) morphosyntax, Terêna (Arawakan) phonology, counting in Mountain Arapesh (Torricelli) and kinship in Akan (Atlantic-Congo). The team problem examined phonological correspondences among the three Jê languages Mẽbêngôkre, Xavante and Krĩkatí.

IOL 2019 
IOL 17 was held from July 29 to August 2, 2019 at the Hankuk University of Foreign Studies in Yongin, South Korea. Chaired by Minkyu Kim and Yoojung Chae, it received 53 teams from 35 countries, with Hong Kong, Uzbekistan and Colombia competing for the first time. The Problem Committee was chaired by Tae Hun Lee. The five problems at the individual contest concerned Yonggom (Ok) morphosyntax, Yurok (Algic) colours, Middle Persian (Iranian) written in Book Pahlavi script, West Tarangan (Aru) reduplication and Nooni (Beboid) morphosyntax and day names. The team problem involved the symbol notation used by judges in rhythmic gymnastics.

IOL 2020 
IOL 18 was to take place from July 20 to 24, 2020, in Ventspils, Latvia. Due to the widespread COVID-19 pandemic, the International Board of the IOL decided to postpone the event to July 19 to 23, 2021, on which it was successfully held. The competition was organised remotely in the respective countries of each team, marking the first time that the mode of competition was adopted at the IOL. Chaired by Vladimir Litvinsky, it received 54 teams from 34 countries, with Azerbaijan competing for the first time. The five problems at the individual contest concerned Ekari (Paniai Lakes) numerals, Zuni (Isolate) semantics with special focus on food, Kilivila (Oceanic) morphosyntax, Agbirigba (a cant language) and its derivation from the Ogbakiri dialect of Ikwerre (Atlantic-Congo), and Rikbaktsa (Macro-Jê) morphology. The team problem involved matching sentences in passages written in Garifuna (Arawakan) with its translations, as well as acknowledging the difference between the language's male and female registers and establishing their relationships with Kari'ña (Cariban) and Lokono (Arawakan), respectively.

IOL 2022 
IOL 19 was held from July 25 to 29, 2022 at King William's College in Castletown, Isle of Man. Chaired by Rob Teare, it received 46 teams from 32 countries, with Moldova, Switzerland and Thailand competing for the first time. The Problem Committee was chaired by Samuel Ahmed. The five problems at the individual contest concerned Ubykh (Abkhaz-Adyghe) morphophonology, the semantics and morphophonology of Alabama (Muskogean) verbs, Nǀuuki (Tuu) syntax, Arabana (Pama-Nyungan) kinship, and phonological changes and tonogenesis in two daughter languages of Proto-Chamic, Phan Rang Cham and Tsat. The team problem presented extracts in 17th and 18th century Manchu (Tungusic) from Cheong-eo Nogeoldae and the Kangxi Emperor's Imperially Commissioned Mirror of the Manchu Language for analysis, with tasks involving matching sentences in Old and Modern Manchu to their respective translations as well as writing in the Manchu script.

Summary 
The different editions of IOL can be summarized on the following table:

 The competition was held remotely.

Participant countries

Individual medalists

Team medals

All-time medal table

Only countries with at least 1 gold medal are listed. The data is accurate up to 2022.

Media coverage
 Newspaper article in The Age "It may be semantics, but linguistics can be a team event". July 27, 2012.

See also
International Science Olympiad
North American Computational Linguistics Open competition
United Kingdom Linguistics Olympiad
Panini Linguistics Olympiad
Bulgarian National Olympiad in Linguistics
Australian Computational and Linguistics Olympiad
Asia Pacific Linguistics Olympiad

Notes

References

External links
 IOL official website
 Borovetz, 2003 – Official website
 Moscow, 2004 – Official website
 Leiden, 2005 – Official website
 Tartu, 2006 – Official website
 St. Petersburg, 2007 – Official website 
 Slanchev Bryag, 2008 – Official website 
 Wrocław, 2009 – Official website
 Stockholm, 2010 – Official website
 Pittsburgh, 2011 – Official website 
 Ljubljana, 2012 – Official website 
 Manchester, 2013 – Official website 
 Beijing, 2014 – Official website
 Blagoevgrad, 2015 – Official website 
 Mysore, 2016 – Official website
 Dublin, 2017 – Official website
 Prague, 2018 - Official website
 Yongin, 2019 - Official website
 Latvia, 2021 (previously, 2020) - Official website 

Linguistics olympiads
International Science Olympiad